The 1986 Western Athletic Conference men's basketball tournament was held March 4–8 at the Arena-Auditorium at the University of Wyoming in Laramie, Wyoming.

UTEP defeated top-seeded  in the championship game, 65–64, to clinch their second WAC men's tournament championship.

The Miners, in turn, received an automatic bid to the 1986 NCAA tournament. Third-seeded Utah, who lost in the quarterfinal round, also earned an at-large bid.

Format
Even though the tournament field remained fixed at nine teams, there were some changes to the tournament structure. Teams were again seeded based on regular season conference records, although the previous double-bye structure for the top two seeds was eliminated. Instead, all teams were entered into the quarterfinal round with the exception of the two lowest-seeded teams, who played in the preliminary first round to determine who would then play against the tournament's top seed.

Bracket

References

WAC men's basketball tournament
Tournament
WAC men's basketball tournament
WAC men's basketball tournament